This is a list of transfers in Dutch football for the 2015 Summer transfer window. Only moves featuring an Eredivisie side are listed.

The summer transfer window will open on June 9, 2015, and will close on August 31, 2015. Deals may be signed at any given moment in the season, but the actual transfer may only take place during the transfer window. Unattached players may sign at any moment.

Notes
 Transfer will take place on 9 June 2015.
 Can rise up to €32,000,000 depending on bonuses.
 Can rise up to €100,000 depending on bonuses.
 Can rise up to €4,000,000 depending on bonuses.
 Can rise up to €12,000,000 depending on results of medical tests.
 Transfer will take place on 1 July 2015.

References

Football transfers summer 15
2015
Football transfers summer 2015